The 1995 Supercopa Libertadores Finals was a two-legged football series to determine the winner of the 1995 Supercopa Libertadores. The finals were contested by Argentine Independiente and Brazilian team Flamengo in November–December 1995.

In the first leg, held in Independiente Stadium in Avellaneda, the local team beat Flamengo 2–0. In the second leg, held in Maracanã Stadium in Rio de Janeiro, Flamengo beat Independiente 1–0. As a result, Independiente won the series 2–1 on aggregate, becoming Supercopa Libertadores champion for second time.

Qualified teams

Venues

Match details

First leg

Second leg

References

s
s
s
Supercopa Libertadores Finals
Football in Avellaneda